During the 2004–05 English football season, Crystal Palace competed in the FA Premier League, following promotion from the First Division (renamed the Championship) the previous season.

Season summary
Despite the 21 league goals of striker Andy Johnson, and being just ahead of the relegation zone for most of the season, Palace were unable to remain in the top flight and were relegated on the last day of the season, following a 2–2 draw with South London rivals Charlton Athletic combined with West Bromwich Albion's 2–0 win over Portsmouth. With relegation, speculation reigned over Johnson's future; Johnson even handed in a transfer request, but ultimately the striker would sign a five-year contract with the club with an improved wage, pledging to help the club regain top-flight status.

Young winger Wayne Routledge also impressed with 10 assists in the Premier League, making him more productive than the likes of Arjen Robben and Steven Gerrard in terms of creativity, but he was snapped up by Tottenham Hotspur following Palace's relegation.

Final league table

Kit
Italian company Diadora became Palace's new kit manufacturers, and introduced a new home kit for the season. The home kit featured red shorts and socks (dispensing with the navy attire of the previous two seasons) and predominantly red shirts with blue stripes. The away kit featured white shirts with blue arms.

Churchill Insurance remained kit sponsors for the fifth consecutive season.

Staff
 Manager: Iain Dowie
 Player-coach: Kit Symons

Players

First-team squad
Squad at end of season

Left club during season

Reserve squad
Squad at end of season

Statistics

Player Statistics
as 16 May 2005
Source:

 *= Second yellow card.

Transfers

In
  Mark Hudson -  Fulham, 11 July, £550,000
  Emmerson Boyce -  Luton Town, 12 July, free transfer
  Julián Speroni -  Dundee, 13 July, £750,000
  Joonas Kolkka -  Borussia Mönchengladbach, 22 July, undisclosed
  Sándor Torghelle -  MTK Hungaria, 3 August, undisclosed
  Fitz Hall -  Southampton, 12 August, £1,500,000
  Wayne Andrews -  Colchester United, 1 September, six-figure fee
  Gonzalo Sorondo -  Inter Milan, 31 August, season loan
  Nicola Ventola -  Inter Milan, 31 August, season loan
  Vassilis Lakis -  AEK Athens, unknown date, unknown fee
  Anthony Danze -  Inglewood United, unknown date, unknown fee

Out
  Julian Gray -  Birmingham City, 23 June, free
  Curtis Fleming -  Darlington, 31 July, undisclosed
  Shaun Derry -  Leeds United, 23 November, £250,000
  Jamie Smith -  Bristol City, August, free
  Ben Surey - Ebbsfleet United
  Gavin Heeroo -  Billericay Town
  Tariq Nabil
  Cédric Berthelin -  RAEC Mons
  Gareth Williams -  Colchester United
  Iván Kaviedes -  Barcelona Sporting Club, loan ended

Results

Premiership

League Cup

FA Cup

Awards
 Andy Johnson: Premier League Player of the Month, October
 Club Goal of the Season: Joonas Kolkka (vs. Liverpool, at Anfield, Premiership)

Notes

References

Crystal Palace F.C. seasons
Cry